Pignans is a commune in the Var department in the Côte d'Azur region of southeastern France.

See also
Communes of the Var department

References

Communes of Var (department)